Blue Clear Sky is the sixteenth studio album by American country music artist George Strait, released on April 23, 1996. The slbum was certified 3× Multi-Platinum in the U.S. for sales of three million copies, the album produced four singles. The title track, "Carried Away", "I Can Still Make Cheyenne", and "King of the Mountain".

Track listing

Personnel
Eddie Bayers – drums
Stuart Duncan – fiddle
Paul Franklin – steel guitar
Steve Gibson – acoustic guitar, electric guitar, gut string guitar
Liana Manis – background vocals
Brent Mason – electric guitar, gut string guitar
Farrell Morris – vibraphone
Matt Rollings – piano, Wurlitzer
George Strait – lead vocals
Biff Watson – acoustic guitar, Wurlitzer
Glenn Worf – bass guitar
Curtis Young – background vocals

Charts

Weekly charts

Year-end charts

References

1996 albums
George Strait albums
MCA Records albums
Albums produced by Tony Brown (record producer)